Nashtifan Rural District is a rural district (dehestan) in the Central District of Khaf County, Razavi Khorasan Province, Iran. At the 2006 census, its population was 1,810, in 388 families.  The rural district has 9 villages.

References 

Rural Districts of Razavi Khorasan Province
Khaf County